David George William Fletcher (6 July 1924 – 27 April 2015) was an English cricketer who played for Surrey. He generally opened the batting, though he moved down the order towards the end of his career. He had a good range of strokes, most notably the drive and the hook.

Born in Sutton, Surrey, Fletcher joined Surrey immediately after the war. He had only a single game in 1946, but the following year established his place in the side and scored four hundreds. One of those came in strange circumstances, when he played for the North against the South at Kingston upon Thames because they were a man short.

From 1948 to 1951 he fared poorly, but he returned to form in 1952, when his 1960 runs at 37.96 made an important contribution to the first of Surrey's seven successive County Championship wins. He also did well in 1953, but after that rather fell away, although he kept his place in the side. He had a good season in 1960, but the following year he played in only one match after mid-May and announced his retirement.

He died on 27 April 2015.

References

External links
CricketArchive
Cricinfo profile

1924 births
2015 deaths
English cricketers
Surrey cricketers
Commonwealth XI cricketers
People educated at Sutton Grammar School
Players cricketers
North v South cricketers